The Prest-O-Lite Trophy Race was an automobile race held at the Indianapolis Motor Speedway in each of the two years prior to the first Indianapolis 500.  The trophy was sponsored by the Prest-O-Lite Company, a manufacturer of automotive lighting systems.  Carl Fisher and James Allison, two of the four co-founders of the Speedway, were also two of the three co-founders of Prest-O-Lite.
-O-Lite Race Held at the Indianapolis Motor Speedway beginning in 1909.

Race results

Sources

Scott, D. Bruce; INDY: Racing Before the 500; Indiana Reflections; 2005; .
Galpin, Darren;  A Record of Motorsport Racing Before World War I.
http://www.motorsport.com/stats/champ/byyear.asp?Y=1909
http://www.motorsport.com/stats/champ/byyear.asp?Y=1910
http://www.champcarstats.com/year/1909.htm
http://www.champcarstats.com/year/1910.htm

Auto races in the United States
Motorsport in Indianapolis